Fely is a name. Notable people with the name include:

 Fely Crisóstomo, Filipina film director and actress
 Fely Franquelli (1916–2002), Filipino dancer, choreographer, and actress
 Fely Irvine (born 1989), Australian actress, singer and dancer
 Pépé Fely, pseudonym of Félix Manuaku Waku (born 1954), a Congolese Rumba guitarist, songwriter, producer, arranger, and lyricist
 Pierre Fely, pseudonym of Pascal Pia (1903–1979), a French writer, journalist, illustrator and scholar